Brusletten is a surname. Notable people with the surname include:

C. L. Brusletten (1853–1929), Norwegian-born American banker, businessman, and politician
Reidun Brusletten (born 1936), Norwegian politician